Southwick House is a Grade II listed 19th-century manor house of the Southwick Estate in Hampshire, England, about  north of Portsmouth. It is home to the Defence School of Policing and Guarding, and related military police capabilities.

History

Early history 
The house was built in 1800 in the late Georgian style, to replace Southwick Park house. The three-storey house is distinct for its two-storey foyer lit from a cupola, and a series of elliptical rooms. A semi-circular portico is centered on the house's colonnade of paired Ionic columns.

World War II 
The house became important during World War II. In 1940, the estate owners allowed the Royal Navy to use the house to accommodate overnight pupils of the Royal Navy School of Navigation, which was based in Portsmouth Naval Dockyard. In 1941, after heavy bombing of the dockyard, the house was requisitioned and became the new home of HMS Dryad.

In 1943, with the planning for D-Day already underway, the house was chosen to be the location of the advance or forward command post (Sharpener Camp)  of the Supreme Headquarters Allied Expeditionary Force. Because of this, HMS Dryad was moved out of the house onto further land requisitioned from the estate.

D-day preparation 

In 1944, in the months leading up to D-Day, the house became the headquarters of the main allied commanders, including Allied Supreme Commander General Eisenhower, Naval Commander-in-Chief Admiral Ramsay and Army Commander-in-Chief General Montgomery.

The large wall maps that were used on D-Day are still in place in the house in the main map room.

After HMS Dryad

Since 2005 it has been home to the tri-Service Defence School of Policing and Guarding (formerly the Defence College of Policing and Guarding).

Listings 
In 1987, the house was recorded as Grade II listed on the National Heritage List for England. 
The following year, the detached clock tower – a three-stage Italianate structure with a slate roof – was also Grade II listed.

References

Bibliography
Beevor, Antony; D-Day: The Battle for Normandy, Viking Publications,

External links
High resolution Gigapixel image of the Southwick House D-Day map
The D-Day Story – information about visiting Southwick House

Royal Military Police Museum

Country houses in Hampshire
Museums in Hampshire
Military and war museums in England
Operation Overlord museums in the United Kingdom
Grade II listed houses in Hampshire